Kerkbuurt (West Frisian: Tjerkebuur) is a town in the Dutch province of North Holland. It is a part of the municipality of Schagen, and lies about 9 km northwest of Heerhugowaard.

References
 

Schagen
Populated places in North Holland